Peter Wolbrandt (born 28 October 1949 in Ulm), is a German  guitarist most  known as a founding member, composer,  and player for  40 years in the rock  and fusion  band Kraan. In  the latter part   of the 1960s together with his younger brother  Jan Fride Wolbrandt and fellow student   Hellmut Hattler he played in  several formations until  they  founded Kraan. Wolbrandt is featured in  almost  all  the band's tours and recordings.  In  1975 and 1982/83 he played in Mani Neumeiers band  Guru Guru. During  a two-year pause taken by  Kraan in  the 1970s, he published a solo  album. In 1976 he also  recorded the  group Highdelberg's eponymous experimental  album with Ax Genrich, Hans-Joachim Roedelius, and Hellmut Hattler. In  1980 with  Kraan,  he composed the film score for the German  movie . by  author and director  During  a longer Kraan break from  1992 to  2000 he worked as a graphic artist  and programmer and founded a company  with  his brother. On  the occasion  of their 30-year  anniversary, Kraan reformed in  the spring  of 2000 and continues to  play with Wolbrandt.

Discography 
See Kraan discography
Solo
So weit (1979)
Under An1x (1998)
AND AGAIN (2005)

References

External  links
Peter Wolbrandt web site
Kraan web site

1949 births
German rock guitarists
German male guitarists
Living people
People from Ulm